
Günther Pape (14 July 1907 – 21 January 1986) was a German general during World War II. He was a recipient of the Knight's Cross of the Iron Cross with Oak Leaves of Nazi Germany.

Following World War II, Pape served in the Bundeswehr of West Germany. The force underwent a series of internal discussion and controversies which led to the "Generalkrise" (Crisis of the generals) in August 1966. Among other issues, the discussion was centered about the inner leadership of the Bundeswehr and the hierarchy of command between the Federal Ministry of Defence and the armed forces. The Inspector of the Luftwaffe General Werner Panitzki and Minister of Defence Kai-Uwe von Hassel resigned on 12 August 1966. Inspector General of the Bundeswehr General Heinrich Trettner resigned the next day followed shortly by Pape, who resigned out of loyalty to his commanding officers.

Awards
 Iron Cross (1939) 2nd Class (20 September 1939) & 1st Class (21 May 1940)
 German Cross in Gold on 23 January 1942 as Major in Krad-Schützen-Bataillon 3
 Knight's Cross of the Iron Cross with Oak Leaves
 Knight's Cross on 10 February 1942 as Major and commander of Krad-Schützen-Bataillon 3
 Oak leaves on 15 September 1943 as Oberst and commander of Panzergrenadier-Regiment 394

References

Citations

Bibliography

 Abenheim, Donald (1989). Bundeswehr und Tradition: die Suche nach dem gültigen Erbe des deutschen Soldaten — Band 27 von Beiträge zur Militär- und Kriegsgeschichte — Band 27 von Beiträge zur Militärgeschichte. Verlag Oldenbourg Wissenschaftsverlag. .
 
 
 

1907 births
1986 deaths
Major generals of the German Army (Wehrmacht)
Recipients of the Gold German Cross
Recipients of the Knight's Cross of the Iron Cross with Oak Leaves
Major generals of the German Army
Military personnel from Düsseldorf